Sioux County is the name of three counties in the United States:

 Sioux County, Iowa
 Sioux County, Nebraska
 Sioux County, North Dakota